Wenquan is a town in Huancui District, Weihai, in eastern Shandong province, China, located just south of the city centre. , it has four residential communities 26 villages under its administration.

See also 
List of township-level divisions of Shandong

References 

Township-level divisions of Shandong
Weihai